The Atatürk Cultural Center is a multi-purpose convention complex located in Antalya, Turkey. Inaugurated in 1996, it is owned by the Antalya Culture and Art Foundation (AKSAV). The complex with a total covered area of 9,000 m² consists of two halls and two foyers for exhibition purposes. Home of the State Opera and Ballet, the State Theater and the State Symphony Orchestra in Antalya, the center hosts various cultural and art events, including the Antalya Golden Orange Film Festival.

The complex is renamed from Antalya Cultural Center since late 2019, currently named after Mustafa Kemal Atatürk.

Aspendos Hall 

Named after the ancient Roman Aspendos amphitheater in the vicinity, it is the largest hall in the complex and is equipped with state-of-the-art audio and video technology. It has a 125-seat balcony and 692-seat capacity arena totalling 817 seats.

Perge Hall 

The second hall in the complex is named after the ancient Greek site Perga, not far from Antalya. The hall, suitable for cinema, theater and concert purposes, can hold 338 people.

Foyers 

The two foyers of Atatürk Cultural Center with a total area of  1,000 m² in two floors serve space for relaxing, receptions or exhibitions.

References 

 AKSAV - AKM Technical specifications 

Buildings and structures in Antalya
Convention centers in Turkey
Music venues in Turkey
Cultural Center (Antalya)